Daniela Monteiro, née Dodean (born January 13, 1988 in Arad), is a Romanian professional table tennis player and European champion.  She competed for Romania in the women's singles and team at the 2008 Summer Olympics, the women's singles at the 2012 Summer Olympics and the team and individual events at the 2016 Summer Olympics.

Since 2011 she lives in Schwechat, Austria and practices at the Werner Schlager Academy.

Personal life
Her brother, Adrian, is also a table tennis player. In July 2013, she married Portuguese table tennis player João Monteiro. On 21 April 2015, she gave birth to a daughter, Lara Melissa, in Vienna.

References

Romanian female table tennis players
Table tennis players at the 2008 Summer Olympics
Table tennis players at the 2012 Summer Olympics
Table tennis players at the 2016 Summer Olympics
Olympic table tennis players of Romania
Living people
1988 births
Sportspeople from Arad, Romania
Romanian expatriates in Austria
Table tennis players at the 2019 European Games
European Games medalists in table tennis
European Games silver medalists for Romania
Table tennis players at the 2020 Summer Olympics